Duffy is a Welsh singer-songwriter from Nefyn, Wales. She has released two studio albums, entitled Rockferry & Endlessly respectively. The former album and its singles have amassed various awards, due to the critical success of her freshman effort. Rockferry and her worldwide successful single "Mercy" were nominated for three Grammy Awards in 2008. The former won the award for Best Pop Vocal Album at the 2009 ceremony for those awards.

BRIT Awards

BMI Pop Music Awards

Echo Music Awards

Fonogram Awards

Gaygalan Awards
Since 1999, the Gaygalan Awards are a Swedish accolade presented by the QX magazine. Duffy has received one nomination.

!
|-
| 2009
|"Mercy"
| International Song of the Year
| 
| style="text-align:center;" | 
|-

Glamour Women of the Year Awards

Grammy Awards

Ivor Novello Awards

Los Premios 40 Principales

Meteor Ireland Music Awards

MOBO Awards

MOJO Awards

Music Producers Guild Awards

MTV

MTV Europe Awards

MTV Music Video Awards

MTV Video Music Japan Awards

Nickelodeon Kid's Choice Awards

United Kingdom

NRJ Music Awards

Oye! Awards

Q Awards

Rockbjörnen Awards

Sound of...

Swiss Music Awards

UK Festival Awards

Urban Music Awards

Vodafone Live Music Awards

World Music Awards

Other recognition
 Honorary fellowship, awarded by the Bangor University.

References

External links
Official website

Awards
Duffy